Pacific Oaks College is a private college with its main campus in Pasadena, California and online degree options. The college draws on Quaker principles and focuses on social justice. It offers full and part-time undergraduate and graduate courses at Pacific Oaks' California campuses as well as online. Pacific Oaks also operates a children's school that has been in operation since 1945.

History
During World War II, members of the Orange Grove Monthly Meeting of Quakers  created a fund to launch a progressive education institute aimed at creating a utopian society of peace. In 1945 the Pacific Oaks Friends School opened with 10 teachers and 65 children aged two to four.

Pacific Oaks College was founded in 1958 following five years of offering upper-division courses through the UCLA Extension.

Academics
The college offers Bachelor of Arts and Master of Arts degrees in addition to post-graduate teaching certification. These programs are focused on education, human development, business, management, and social work.

The programs are organized into two schools:
School of Cultural and Family Psychology
School of Human Development & Education

Campuses

Pasadena campus
The main campus is located in Pasadena, California at the north end of Old Pasadena. The school can be accessed via the nearby Memorial Park Station of the Metro L Line light rail and sits north of the Ventura Freeway (SR 134) and Foothill Freeway (I-210) junction.

Off-campus sites
In addition to its main campus in Pasadena, Pacific Oaks offers classes at  sites throughout the state of California.

Andrew Norman Library
The Andrew Norman Library on the Eureka (Pasadena) Campus supports the degree programs of Pacific Oaks College and Pacific Oaks Children's School, as well as independent faculty research. The collection, which has more than 17,000 titles, reflects the most current research and centers on early childhood education and curriculum development, human development, family systems and therapy, and child care.

Accreditation

Western Association of Schools and Colleges
Pacific Oaks College is accredited by the Western Association of Schools and Colleges (WASC). Pacific Oaks has been accredited by WASC since 1959.

Affiliations and memberships
TCS Education System.
Association of Independent Colleges and Universities (California)
Hispanic Association of Colleges and Universities
Faculty memberships in the American Association of University Professors

Program-based accreditation
Its M.A. in MFT program satisfies all of the requirements of the Board of Behavioral Sciences (BBS), (Business & Professions Code Sections 4980.41 (a) (d) (e)) for licensing in Marriage and Family Therapy.
Its Teacher Education Program is certified by the California Commission on Teacher Credentialing (CCTC) for certification in Education Specialist Credential, Mild to Moderate Disabilities Level I & Level II and Preliminary Multiple Subject English Learner Teaching Credential.

Notable alumni
 Antonia Darder, scholar, poet, activist, public intellectual
 Leah Ayres, actor
 Bre Pettis - entrepreneur, artist, co-founder of MakerBot Industries

References

External links
 Official website

Universities and colleges in Los Angeles County, California
Educational institutions established in 1945
Schools of education in California
Early childhood education in the United States
Schools accredited by the Western Association of Schools and Colleges
1945 establishments in California
Education in Pasadena, California
Private universities and colleges in California